The Franklin Square station was an express station on the demolished IRT Third Avenue Line in Manhattan, New York City. It was built by the New York Elevated Railroad in 1878 over the aforementioned square, had two tracks and one island platform, and was the northernmost station on the line that shared both Second Avenue and Third Avenue trains. The next stop to the north was Chatham Square. The next stop to the south was Fulton Street. The station closed on December 22, 1950.

References

External links
http://www.nycsubway.org/lines/3rdave-el.html
https://web.archive.org/web/20100609061601/http://www.stationreporter.net/3avl.htm

IRT Third Avenue Line stations
Railway stations in the United States opened in 1878
Railway stations closed in 1950
Former elevated and subway stations in Manhattan